Bizzarro is an Italian surname. Notable people with this surname include:

Gennaro Bizzarro (born 1975/1976), member of the Connecticut Senate
Ryan Bizzarro (born 1985), member of the Pennsylvania House of Representatives

See also
Bizarro (disambiguation)
Bazzaro, a similar surname